First Yaya is a 2021 Philippine television drama romance comedy series broadcast by GMA Network. Directed by L.A. Madridejos, it stars Sanya Lopez in the title role. It premiered on March 15, 2021 on the network's Telebabad line up replacing Anak ni Waray vs. Anak ni Biday. The series concluded on July 2, 2021 with a total of 78 episodes. It was replaced by The World Between Us in its timeslot. 

A continuation of the series, First Lady aired in 2022. The series is streaming online on YouTube.

Cast and characters

Lead cast
 Sanya Lopez as Melody Reyes-Acosta

Supporting cast
 Gabby Concepcion as Glenn Francisco Acosta
 Pancho Magno as  Conrad Enriquez
 Cassy Legaspi as Nina Acosta
 Joaquin Domagoso as Jonas Clarito
 Sandy Andolong as Edna Reyes
 Gardo Versoza as Luis Prado
 Maxine Medina as Lorraine Prado
 Boboy Garovillo as Florencio Reyes
 Pilar Pilapil as Blessilda "Blessie" Acosta
 Kakai Bautista as Pepita San Jose
 Cai Cortez as Norma Robles
 Analyn Barro as Gemmalyn Rose "Gemrose" Reyes
 Thou Reyes as Yessey Reyes
 Patricia Coma as Nicole Acosta
 Clarence Delgado as Nathan Acosta
 Thia Thomalla as Valerie "Val" Cañete
 Jon Lucas as Titus de Villa
 Glenda Garcia as Marni Tupaz
 Anjo Damiles as Jasper Agcaoili
 Kiel Rodriguez as Paul Librada
 Jerick Dolormente as Lloyd Reyes
 Hailey Mendes as Charlotte "Charlie" Barboa

Guest cast
 Boots Anson-Roa as Diane Carlos
 Jean Garcia as Christine Acosta
 Andre Paras as Alexander Carlos
 Tommy Abuel as Anthony Carlos
 Allen Dizon as Subido
 Mikoy Morales as Jaime
 Jenzel Angeles as Paige 
 Lovely Rivero as Viola
 Frances Makil-Ignacio as Rosales
 Wilma Doesn't as Matilda
 Issa Litton as Helena Buenaventura
 Michael Roy Jornales as Danilo Garcia
 Dennis Marasigan as Ezekiel Lopez
 Muriel Lomadilla as Beverly "Bevs" Oliveros
 Rollie Inocencio as Pedrito Conde
 Nicki Morena as Aila
 Julius Miguel as Osmond Buenaventura
 Atak as Impak
 Cecile Paz as Jess
 Chinggay Datu as Kathy Baluyot
 Lourdes Conde Serrano as Lourdes
 Michael Flores as Allan Buenaventura
 Marnie Lapus as Mercedeta "Mercy" L. Primavera
 Luis Hontiveros as Jason
 Teresa Loyzaga as Alessandra "Sandra" Robles
 Polo Ravales

Production
In November 2019, Marian Rivera was hired to portray the role of First Yaya.
Principal photography was halted in March 2020 due to the enhanced community quarantine in Luzon caused by the COVID-19 pandemic. Rivera left the series in September 2020, due to the safety protocols of the series' filming. Sanya Lopez was later hired as the replacement in October 2020. Actor Kelvin Miranda was also initially hired for the role of Jonas Clarito. He was pulled out from the series to appear in the drama series The Lost Recipe. Joaquin Domagoso served as his replacement. Filming was continued in November 2020.

Ratings
According to AGB Nielsen Philippines' Nationwide Urban Television Audience Measurement People in television homes, the pilot episode of First Yaya earned a 23% rating. The final episode scored a 19.2% rating.

References

External links
 
 

2021 Philippine television series debuts
2021 Philippine television series endings
Filipino-language television shows
GMA Network drama series
Philippine political television series
Philippine romantic comedy television series
Television productions postponed due to the COVID-19 pandemic
Television shows set in the Philippines